The Gentle Falcon is a historical novel for young readers by Hilda Lewis, based on the story of  King Richard II and his child bride, Isabella, written in first person from the point of view of a close companion of the Queen. It was published by Oxford University Press in 1952 and adapted as a television series by the BBC in 1954. In 1957 the first American edition was published by Criterion Books.

Hilda Lewis, a prolific writer of adult historical fiction, also wrote two other historical novels for young adult readers, Harold Was My King (about Harold Godwinson) and Here Comes Harry (set in 15th century London).

Plot summary
Isabella Clinton is the daughter and only child of a French noblewoman, from the House of Valois, and an English soldier. With her father dead, she is heir to his estate but prefers working in the fields to learning to be a proper noblewoman. This is made clear from her sharp tongue and blunt way of speaking.

After the death of her father, it seems that the Black Prince has forgotten Isabella and her mother. It is quite a long time before Isabella is finally summoned to court by King Richard – and when she finally is, it is to be companion to her young kinswoman, Isabella of the House of Valois, Madame of France and soon to be Queen of England.

It is through Isabella Clinton's eyes that we see the love Isabella of France develops for King Richard. Although only seven years old at her first appearance, the Queen shows maturity for her age – but what happens to her throughout the book causes her great sorrow, even though she does not show it on the outside.

Reception
In a star review, Kirkus Reviews described The Gentle Falcon as a "sparkling, poignant fictionalized biography" and "princely reading fare." while the Wisconsin library bulletin reprinted a review by the Bulletin of the Children's Book Center that called it "An intriguing story..."

Television adaptation
The British Broadcasting Corporation produced a seven-episode television series based on The Gentle Falcon, which was broadcast from 15 June 1954. Glen Alyn played the adult Isabella, while Victoria Nolan played her as a girl.

Sources
The Gentle Falcon, by Hilda Lewis

References

1952 British novels
1952 children's books
Children's historical novels
British children's novels
British historical novels
Novels set in the Middle Ages
Novels about royalty
Oxford University Press books